Purappadu is a 1983 Malayalam-language Indian feature film directed by Rajeevnath, starring Nedumudi Venu, Bharath Gopi in lead roles.

Cast
Nedumudi Venu
Bharath Gopi
Kottarakkara Sreedharan Nair
Sarmila

References

1983 films
1980s Malayalam-language films